Nord Stream AG is a consortium for construction and operation of the Nord Stream 1 submarine pipeline between Vyborg in Russia and Greifswald in Germany. The consortium was incorporated in Zug, Switzerland, on 30 November 2005. The original name of company was the North European Gas Pipeline Company. The company was renamed to Nord Stream AG on 4 October 2006 ("Nord" is German for "North").

Since the first gas delivery in 2011, the company has transported over 450 billion cubic metres of natural gas to Europe. In 2020, the German Federal Network Agency highlighted again the Nord Stream Pipeline’s contribution to security of energy supply in Europe.

Gas deliveries ceased in September 2022 following the destruction of three of the pipe lines and sanctions linked to the Russian invasion of Ukraine.

Shareholders
The shareholders of Nord Stream AG are:

 Gazprom International Projects LLC, a subsidiary of Gazprom – 51%
 Wintershall Dea AG – 15.5%
 PEG Infrastruktur AG, a subsidiary of E.ON Beteiligungen – 15.5%
 N.V. Nederlandse Gasunie – 9%
 Engie – 9%

On 1 March 2010, French energy company GDF Suez (changed name to Engie in 2015) signed with Gazprom a memorandum of understanding to acquire 9% stake in the project. Accordingly, the stakes of Wintershall and E.ON fell by 4.5% to 15.5%.

References

External links
Nord Stream AG official website (English; Russian; German)

Natural gas pipeline companies
Oil and gas companies of Switzerland
Gazprom subsidiaries
Uniper
Engie

nl:Nord Stream AG